The Gold Record is the seventh studio album by American punk rock band the Bouncing Souls and was released on June 6, 2006. The band deemed this release to be 'the release of the beast' in reference to the date (6/6/06) being similar to the number of the beast (666).

The album includes two covers, of "Lean on Sheena" by Avoid One Thing and "Better Things" by The Kinks. "Letter from Iraq" is based on a poem sent to the band by Garett Reppenhagen, a soldier serving in Iraq.

Release
On February 9, 2006, the Bouncing Souls' next album was announced for release in four months' time. In March and April 2005, they went on tours of Japan (with Street Dogs), New Zealand, and Australia. The album's track listing was posted online on April 11, 2006, followed by the artwork and album's title nine days later. On April 25, 2006, "The Gold Song" was made available for free download through Epitaph Records' website; "The Pizza Song" followed on May 23, 2006. On June 2, 2006, The Gold Record was made available for streaming through Warped Tour's website, ahead of its release four days later through Epitaph Records. Leading up to this, the band held a week-long series of shows at the Knitting Factory in New York City. On June 19, 2006, a music video was released for "The Pizza Song". They promoted the album by touring on the entirety of the 2006 Warped Tour; on August 8, 2006, the album was released as a vinyl picture disc on their own label Chunksaah Records.

Between October and December 2006, the band embarked on their headlining US tour, dubbed Gold Tour. They were supported by Street Dogs, Whole Wheat Bread, the World/Inferno Friendship Society, and Left Alone. In January 2007, the Bouncing Souls performed at a special event marking a Warped Tour exhibition at the Rock and Roll Hall of Fame. In February 2007, they went on a tour of the UK with the Draft. On March 30, 2007, the music video for "Lean on Sheena" was posted online. In April and May 2007, the band embarked on a Canadian tour with Strike Anywhere, the Loved Ones, and Static Radio. In May and June 2007, the Bouncing Souls played three shows in Japan, and performed four US East Coast shows, which included an appearance at the School of Rock Festival.

In September 2007, the band appeared at the Bumbershoot festival, and went on a short East Coast tour the following month with Modern Life Is War, the World/Inferno Friendship Society, and the Low Budgets. They ended the year with a tour of Australia in November and December 2007, and a trio of holiday shows at The Stone Pony in Asbury Park, New Jersey. For the three shows, the band played 60 different tracks from their catalogue. Bookending appearances at the Bamboozle Left and The Bamboozle festivals, the band went on a short US tour in April 2008 with Dead to Me, Static Radio NJ, Tim Barry, and the Gaslight Anthem. Following this, the band appeared on Warped Tour again for two weeks in July 2008, and went on a short tour in September 2008. They then appeared at Riot Fest in October 2008, and played a handful of shows with Strike Anywhere, the Casting One, Gimme Drugs, Youth Brigade, Kevin Seconds, and Nothington. They ended the year with a performance at Fun Fun Fun Fest.

Track listing

Personnel

The Bouncing Souls
 Greg Attonito – vocals, harmonica
 Pete Steinkopf – guitar
 Bryan Kienlen – bass guitar, backing vocals
 Michael McDermott – drums

Additional musicians
Jeff Abarta, Ted Hutt, Johnny Madcap, Ace Von Johnson & Chuck Ragan – backing vocals
Rami Jaffee – accordion, keyboards

Artwork
 Bryan Kienlen – artwork, layout design, photography

Production
Ted Hutt – producer
Tom Baker – mastering
Ryan Mall – engineer

Charts

References

The Bouncing Souls albums
2006 albums
Epitaph Records albums